Sinomicrobium pectinilyticum is a Gram-negative, non-spore-forming and pectinase-producing bacterium from the genus of Sinomicrobium.

References

Flavobacteria
Bacteria described in 2014